Olmstead v. L.C., 527 U.S. 581 (1999), is a United States Supreme Court case regarding discrimination against people with mental disabilities.  The Supreme Court held that under the Americans with Disabilities Act, individuals with mental disabilities have the right to live in the community rather than in institutions if, in the words of the opinion of the Court, "the State's treatment professionals have determined that community placement is appropriate, the transfer from institutional care to a less restrictive setting is not opposed by the affected individual, and the placement can be reasonably accommodated, taking into account the resources available to the State and the needs of others with mental disabilities." The case was brought by the Atlanta Legal Aid Society on behalf of Lois Curtis.

Background 
Tommy Olmstead, Commissioner, Georgia Department of Human Resources, et al. v. L. C., by Zimring, guardian ad litem and next friend, et al. (Olmstead v. L.C.) was a case filed in 1995 and decided in 1999 before the United States Supreme Court. The plaintiffs, L.C. (Lois Curtis, deceased November 3, 2022) and E.W. (Elaine Wilson, deceased December 4, 2005), were two women who were diagnosed with schizophrenia, intellectual disability and personality disorder. They had both been treated in institutional settings and in community based treatments in the state of Georgia.

Following clinical assessments by state employees, both plaintiffs were determined to be better suited for treatment in a community-based setting rather than in the institution. The plaintiffs remained confined in the institution, each for several years after the initial treatment was concluded. Both sued the state of Georgia to prevent them from being inappropriately treated and housed in the institutional setting.

Opinion of the Court 
The case rose to the level of the United States Supreme Court, which decided the case in 1999, and plays a major role in determining that mental illness is a form of disability and therefore covered under the Americans with Disabilities Act (ADA).  Title II of the ADA applies to 'public entities' and include 'state and local governments' and 'any department, agency or special purpose district' and protects any 'qualified person with a disability' from exclusion from participation in or denied the benefits of services, programs, or activities of a public entity.

The Supreme Court decided mental illness is a form of disability and that "unjustified isolation" of a person with a disability is a form of discrimination under Title II of the ADA. The Supreme Court held that community placement is only required and appropriate (i.e., institutionalization is unjustified), when –"[a] the State's treatment professionals have determined that community placement is appropriate, [b] the transfer from institutional care to a less restrictive setting is not opposed by the affected individual, and [c] the placement can be reasonably accommodated, taking into account the resources available to the State and the needs of others with mental disabilities.
Unjustified isolation is discrimination based on disability.

The Supreme Court explained that this holding "reflects two evident judgments." First, "institutional placement of persons who can handle and benefit from community settings perpetuates unwarranted assumptions that persons so isolated are incapable or unworthy of participating in community life." Second, historically "confinement in an institution severely diminishes the everyday life activities of individuals, including family relations, social contacts, work options, economic independence, educational advancement, and cultural enrichment." Id. at 600–601.

However, a majority of Justices in Olmstead also recognized an ongoing role for publicly and privately operated institutions: "We emphasize that nothing in the ADA or its implementing regulations condones termination of institutional settings for persons unable to handle or benefit from community settings...Nor is there any federal requirement that community-based treatment be imposed on patients who do not desire it." Id. at 601–602.

A plurality of Justices noted: "[N]o placement outside the institution may ever be appropriate . . . 'Some individuals, whether mentally retarded or mentally ill, are not prepared at particular times - perhaps in the short run, perhaps in the long run - for the risks and exposure of the less protective environment of community settings ' for these persons, 'institutional settings are needed and must remain available'" (quoting Amicus Curiae Brief for the American Psychiatric Association, et al.). "As already observed [by the majority], the ADA is not reasonably read to impel States to phase out institutions, placing patients in need of close care at risk... 'Each disabled person is entitled to treatment in the most integrated setting possible for that person—recognizing on a case-by-case basis, that setting may be an institution'[quoting VOR's Amici Curiae brief]." Id. at 605.

Justice Kennedy noted in his concurring opinion, "It would be unreasonable, it would be a tragic event, then, were the Americans with Disabilities Act of 1990 (ADA) to be interpreted so that states had some incentive, for fear of litigation to drive those in need of medical care and treatment out of appropriate care and into settings with too little assistance and supervision." Id. at 610.

The Supreme Court did not reach the question of whether there is a constitutional right to community services in the most integrated setting.

About ten years after the Olmstead decision, the State of Georgia and the United States Department of Justice entered a settlement agreement to cease all admissions of individuals with developmental disabilities to state-operated, federally licensed institutions ("State Hospitals") and, by July 1, 2015, "transition all individuals with developmental disabilities in the State Hospitals from the Hospitals to community settings," according to a Department of Justice Fact Sheet about the settlement. The settlement also calls for serving 9,000 individuals with mental illness in community settings. Recently, the federal court's Independent Reviewer for the settlement found significant health and safety risks, including many deaths, harming former State Hospital residents due to their transition from a licensed facility home to community-settings per the settlement. The Court has approved a moratorium on such transfers until the safety of those impacted can be assured.

See also
 ADA Litigation in the United States
 Jarvis hearings
 List of United States Supreme Court cases, volume 527
 List of United States Supreme Court cases
 Lists of United States Supreme Court cases by volume

References

External links 
 
 Bazelon Center for Mental Health Law: Olmstead Introduction Page
 Olmstead Rights Website Olmstead Rights

United States disability case law
Mental health law in the United States
United States Supreme Court cases
United States Supreme Court cases of the Rehnquist Court
1999 in United States case law
Americans with Disabilities Act of 1990
Deinstitutionalization in the United States
Mental health case law